The 2011 Intersport Heilbronn Open was a professional tennis tournament played on hard courts. It was the 24th edition of the tournament which was part of the 2011 ATP Challenger Tour. It took place in Heilbronn, Germany between 24 and 30 January 2011.

Singles main-draw entrants

Seeds

 Rankings are as of January 17, 2011.

Other entrants
The following players received wildcards into the singles main draw:
  Daniel Brands
  Peter Gojowczyk
  Andrey Golubev
  Tobias Kamke

The following players received entry from the qualifying draw:
  Grégoire Burquier
  Yannick Mertens
  Michael Ryderstedt
  Alexandre Sidorenko

The following players received entry as a Lucky loser into the singles main draw:
  Dieter Kindlmann

Champions

Singles

 Bastian Knittel def.  Daniel Brands, 7–6(4), 7–6(5)

Doubles

 Jamie Delgado /  Jonathan Marray def.  Frank Moser /  David Škoch, 6–1, 6–4

External links
Official Website
ITF Search 
ATP official site

Intersport Heilbronn Open
2011 in German tennis
Intersport Heilbronn Open
2010s in Baden-Württemberg